Yunnanilus spanisbripes is a species of ray-finned fish, a stone loach, in the genus Yunnanilus. The type locality of this species is the Niulanjiang River in Zhanyi County in Yunnan.

References

S
Fish described in 2009